The Multan Fort was a historic fort in the city of Multan. According to some estimates the original fort was built by Katoch Dynasty Rajput between 800 and 1000 B.C. However, it was later destroyed. It was rebuilt by Ranghar chiefs near the city of Multan, on a hillock separated from the city by the Ravi River. The fort was destroyed by British forces during British colonial rule.

The fort was notable for both its effectiveness as a defence installation and for its architecture. The fort's 46 bastions included two flanking towers at each of the four gates (the De, Sikki, Hareri and Khizri Gates).

Within the fort stood a citadel flanked by 30 towers, enclosing mosques, a Hindu temple and a Khan's palace.  The citadel was severely damaged by the battering it got from the guns  in 1818.

See also
City Wall of Multan
List of UNESCO World Heritage Sites in Pakistan
List of forts in Pakistan
List of museums in Pakistan

References

External links
 MULTAN: TMA-Archaeology row over Multan heritage Dawn Newspapers, 2004
 Multan Fort: Short History
 Multan Fort
 Multan Information

History of Multan
Fort
Forts in Punjab, Pakistan
Tourist attractions in Multan